Anne Buijs (born 2 Décember 1991) is a Dutch volleyball player. She has been a member of the Women's National Team since 2008. She currently plays for Brazilian club Dentil Praia Clube.

Career
Buijs has been playing volleyball since 1997, where she played at Polisport. Buijs first played professionally for the national team of the Netherlands in May 2008.

She was a leader, along with Celeste Plak, against the Serbian team in the 2014 FIVB Volleyball Women's World Championship. In 2015, her conversion at the end of the game allowed the Dutch to win against the Czech Republic in the opening match of the FIVB World Grand Prix.

Awards

Individuals
2015 Montreux Volley Masters "Best Outside Spikers"
2015 European Championship "Best Outside Spiker"
2017 European Championship "Best Outside Spiker"

Clubs
2017 South American Club Championship –  Champion, with Rexona/SESC
2016/17 Brazilian Superliga –  Champion, with Rexona/SESC
2017 Club World Championship –  Runner-up, with Rexona/SESC
2020/21 Brazilian Superliga –  Runner-up, with Dentil/Praia Clube
2021/22 Brazilian Superliga –  Runner-up, with Dentil/Praia Clube
2021 South American Club Championship –  Champion, with Dentil/Praia Clube
2021 South American Club Championship –  Runner-up, with Dentil/Praia Clube

References

External links
FIVB profile

1991 births
Living people
Dutch women's volleyball players
Dutch expatriate sportspeople in Azerbaijan
Dutch expatriate sportspeople in Belgium
Dutch expatriate sportspeople in Brazil
Dutch expatriate sportspeople in Germany
Dutch expatriate sportspeople in Italy
Dutch expatriate sportspeople in Turkey
Expatriate volleyball players in Belgium
Expatriate volleyball players in Germany
Expatriate volleyball players in Italy
Expatriate volleyball players in Turkey
Lokomotiv Baku volleyball players
Volleyball players at the 2016 Summer Olympics
European Games competitors for the Netherlands
Volleyball players at the 2015 European Games
People from Oostzaan
Nilüfer Belediyespor volleyballers
VakıfBank S.K. volleyballers
Expatriate volleyball players in Brazil
Olympic volleyball players of the Netherlands
Sportspeople from North Holland